The 1926–27 New York Rangers season was the franchise's first season. The team placed first in the new American Division and qualified for the playoffs, losing to the Boston Bruins. They were the last expansion team to win their division until the 1967–68 Philadelphia Flyers (which had a division full of expansion teams) and the last to do so without guarantee to win it until the 2017–18 Vegas Golden Knights. In the playoffs that year, they lost to second place Boston Bruins in the Semifinals.

Off-season
The Rangers team was organized by Conn Smythe who used his extensive knowledge of available amateur players along with sound selection of players available from the dispersal of the Western Hockey League (WHL):

 The brothers Bill and Bun Cook were part of the dispersed players of the WHL, having played for the Saskatoon Sheiks;
 Frank Boucher was from the Vancouver Maroons of the WHL;
 Leo Bourgeault was also from Saskatoon of the WHL;
 Murray Murdoch had been a member of the 1923 Memorial Cup-winning University of Manitoba;
 Paul Thompson was a member of the junior Calgary Canadians, Memorial Cup winners in 1926;
 Taffy Abel had been a member of the silver medal-winning United States team in the 1924 Olympics;
 Stan Brown had been a member of the Allan Cup-winning Toronto Dentals team.

Smythe signed several players from the amateur Minneapolis Millers, including Taffy Abel, Billy Boyd and Ching Johnson. The 1925–26 Millers also provided other players to the NHL in the future, including Cooney Weiland and Tiny Thompson, Paul Thompson's brother.

Training camp was held in Toronto at the Ravina Gardens arena near Smythe's home. However, before the season started, Smythe was fired by the club and Lester Patrick took over from Smythe. Patrick received the job as part of the dispersal agreement of the WHL. His brother Frank received a job at the Boston Bruins. Smythe would eventually receive a $10,000 severance, a large amount in those days.

Regular season
Unlike the arenas where the players played before, the Madison Square Garden was kept heated. The temperature was warm due to the insistence of Tex Rickard, who insisted that "the public was everything and the performers nothing". The players complained about the conditions publicly and to Lester Patrick.

On opening night November 16, 1926 at Madison Square Garden, the ceremonial face-off between Frank Boucher of the Rangers and Nels Stewart of the Montreal Maroons was done by Lois Moran, the silent-film movie star. The opening night referee was Lou Marsh. The starting lineup was Boucher, Bill Cook, Bun Cook, Ching Johnson, Taffy Abel and Hal Winkler. The Rangers would win the game 1–0.

Final standings

Record vs. opponents

Schedule and results

|- align="center" bgcolor="#CCFFCC"
| 1 || 16 || Montreal Maroons || 1–0 || 1–0–0
|- align="center" bgcolor="#CCFFCC"
| 2 || 20 || @ Toronto Maple Leafs || 5–1 || 2–0–0
|- align="center" bgcolor="#FFBBBB"
| 3 || 25 || @ Pittsburgh Pirates || 2–0 || 2–1–0
|- align="center" bgcolor="#CCFFCC"
| 4 || 27 || @ Montreal Canadiens || 2–0 || 3–1–0
|- align="center" bgcolor="#CCFFCC"
| 5 || 30 || Chicago Black Hawks || 4 – 3 OT || 4–1–0
|-

|- align="center" bgcolor="#FFBBBB"
| 6 || 4 || @ Detroit Cougars || 1–0 || 4–2–0
|- align="center" bgcolor="#CCFFCC"
| 7 || 7 || @ Boston Bruins || 1–0 || 5–2–0
|- align="center" bgcolor="#CCFFCC"
| 8 || 12 || Boston Bruins || 2 – 1 OT || 6–2–0
|- align="center" bgcolor="#FFBBBB"
| 9 || 15 || @ Chicago Black Hawks || 6–2 || 6–3–0
|- align="center" bgcolor="white"
| 10 || 19 || Detroit Cougars || 1 – 1 OT || 6–3–1
|- align="center" bgcolor="#CCFFCC"
| 11 || 21 || Pittsburgh Pirates || 1–0 || 7–3–1
|- align="center" bgcolor="#FFBBBB"
| 12 || 23 || @ Ottawa Senators || 1–0 || 7–4–1
|- align="center" bgcolor="#FFBBBB"
| 13 || 26 || @ New York Americans || 5–2 || 7–5–1
|- align="center" bgcolor="#FFBBBB"
| 14 || 28 || Ottawa Senators || 3 – 2 OT || 7–6–1
|-

|- align="center" bgcolor="#CCFFCC"
| 15 || 1 || @ Chicago Black Hawks || 4–0 || 8–6–1
|- align="center" bgcolor="#CCFFCC"
| 16 || 6 || Montreal Canadiens || 1–0 || 9–6–1
|- align="center" bgcolor="#CCFFCC"
| 17 || 9 || Detroit Cougars || 4–1 || 10–6–1
|- align="center" bgcolor="#CCFFCC"
| 18 || 11 || @ Montreal Maroons || 3–2 || 11–6–1
|- align="center" bgcolor="white"
| 19 || 13 || Toronto Maple Leafs || 1 – 1 OT || 11–6–2
|- align="center" bgcolor="#CCFFCC"
| 20 || 16 || Chicago Black Hawks || 5–4 || 12–6–2
|- align="center" bgcolor="#FFBBBB"
| 21 || 18 || @ Boston Bruins || 7–3 || 12–7–2
|- align="center" bgcolor="white"
| 22 || 20 || Boston Bruins || 2 – 2 OT || 12–7–3
|- align="center" bgcolor="#CCFFCC"
| 23 || 23 || New York Americans || 2–0 || 13–7–3
|- align="center" bgcolor="#CCFFCC"
| 24 || 27 || @ Montreal Canadiens || 3–2 || 14–7–3
|- align="center" bgcolor="#CCFFCC"
| 25 || 29 || Detroit Cougars || 2–0 || 15–7–3
|-

|- align="center" bgcolor="#FFBBBB"
| 26 || 1 || Montreal Canadiens || 1 – 0 OT || 15–8–3
|- align="center" bgcolor="#CCFFCC"
| 27 || 6 || Pittsburgh Pirates || 2–1 || 16–8–3
|- align="center" bgcolor="#CCFFCC"
| 28 || 10 || @ Toronto Maple Leafs || 3–2 || 17–8–3
|- align="center" bgcolor="#CCFFCC"
| 29 || 12 || @ Pittsburgh Pirates || 3 – 2 OT || 18–8–3
|- align="center" bgcolor="white"
| 30 || 15 || @ Ottawa Senators || 2 – 2 OT || 18–8–4
|- align="center" bgcolor="#FFBBBB"
| 31 || 17 || Montreal Maroons || 4–1 || 18–9–4
|- align="center" bgcolor="#CCFFCC"
| 32 || 20 || Boston Bruins || 3–1 || 19–9–4
|- align="center" bgcolor="#FFBBBB"
| 33 || 22 || Toronto Maple Leafs || 3 – 2 OT || 19–10–4
|- align="center" bgcolor="#FFBBBB"
| 34 || 24 || Ottawa Senators || 1–0 || 19–11–4
|- align="center" bgcolor="#CCFFCC"
| 35 || 27 || @ New York Americans || 4–1 || 20–11–4
|-

|- align="center" bgcolor="#FFBBBB"
| 36 || 1 || @ Chicago Black Hawks || 3–0 || 20–12–4
|- align="center" bgcolor="white"
| 37 || 5 || @ Montreal Maroons || 0 – 0 OT || 20–12–5
|- align="center" bgcolor="white"
| 38 || 13 || @ Detroit Cougars || 2 – 2 OT || 20–12–6
|- align="center" bgcolor="#CCFFCC"
| 39 || 15 || @ Pittsburgh Pirates || 5–0 || 21–12–6
|- align="center" bgcolor="#CCFFCC"
| 40 || 17 || @ Detroit Cougars || 2–0 || 22–12–6
|- align="center" bgcolor="#CCFFCC"
| 41 || 20 || New York Americans || 2–1 || 23–12–6
|- align="center" bgcolor="#CCFFCC"
| 42 || 22 || Pittsburgh Pirates || 4–1 || 24–12–6
|- align="center" bgcolor="#CCFFCC"
| 43 || 25 || Chicago Black Hawks || 4–0 || 25–12–6
|- align="center" bgcolor="#FFBBBB"
| 44 || 26 || @ Boston Bruins || 4 – 3 OT || 25–13–6
|-

Playoffs

The Rangers earned a bye in the first round and met the Boston Bruins in the semi-final. The Rangers were limited to one goal in the two games, losing the series three goals to one.

Key:  Win  Loss

Player statistics

Skaters

Goaltenders

Goaltenders

†Denotes player spent time with another team before joining Rangers. Stats reflect time with Rangers only.
‡Traded mid-season. Stats reflect time with Rangers only.

See also
 1926–27 NHL season

References
 
Notes

External links
 1926–27 New York Rangers Statistics
 New York Rangers 1926–1927 Season

New York Rangers seasons
New York Rangers
New York Rangers
New York Rangers
New York Rangers
Madison Square Garden
1920s in Manhattan